Thibaut De Marre (born 23 February 1998) is a Belgian cross-country skier. He competed in the 15 kilometre classical, the 30 kilometre skiathlon and the sprint at the 2022 Winter Olympics.

References

External links

1998 births
Living people
Belgian male cross-country skiers
Cross-country skiers at the 2022 Winter Olympics
Olympic cross-country skiers of Belgium
Sportspeople from Grenoble
Cross-country skiers at the 2016 Winter Youth Olympics